Ernest Binfield Havell (16 September 1861 – 31 December 1934), who published under the name E.B. Havell, was an influential English arts administrator, art historian and author of numerous books about Indian art and architecture. He was a member of the Havell family of artists and art educators. He was the principal of the Government School of Art, Calcutta from 1896 to 1905, where, along with Abanindranath Tagore, he developed a style of art and art education based on Indian rather than Western models, which led to the foundation of the Bengal school of art.

Early life
Ernest was born at Jesse Terrace, Reading in the English county of Berkshire in 1861, the son of an artist Charles Richard Havell and his wife, Charlotte Amelia Lord. The family had several artists and publishers. He went to Reading School and learned art at the Royal College of Art and in Paris and Italy.

Art history
In India, Havell initially served the Madras School of Art as Superintendent for a decade from 1884. He arrived Calcutta on 5 July 1896 and joined as Superintendent of the Government School of Art, Calcutta next day. In between, he went to England for a year from April 1902 to March 1903. While in England, he published two valuable articles on Indian art in the October 1902 and January 1903 issues of a well known art journal of London, The Studio. In January 1906 he left for England on long leave and finally in 1908, he was removed from the post.

Havell worked with Abanindranath Tagore to redefine Indian art education. He established the Indian Society of Oriental Art, which sought to adapt British art education in India so as to reject the previous emphasis placed on European traditions in favour of revivals of native Indian styles of art, in particular the Mughal miniature tradition. He published several books on Indian art including Indian Sculpture and Painting (1908) and The Ideals of Indian Art (1911). He was involved in founding the India Society along with William Rothenstein in 1910 as a reaction to negative remarks made by Sir George Birdwood on Indian art.

Personal life
He married Angelique Wilhelmina Jacobsen, daughter of a Danish navy officer in 1895 at St Giles, London, Middlesex, England. The couple had a daughter, Sonia Joyce Havell in 1902. He died at the Acland Nursing Home in Oxford.

Works
Havell wrote numerous books on Indian art and history, including:

Notes

External links
 
 
 Indian Architecture, Its Psychology, Structure, and History from the First Muhannadan Invasion to the Present Day on Architexturez South Asia

1861 births
1934 deaths
English Indologists
British people in colonial India
English art historians
English architecture writers
English art critics
British arts administrators
People from Reading, Berkshire
British art teachers